KVHC-LD (channel 15) is a low-power television station licensed to Kerrville, Texas, United States, serving the San Antonio area as an affiliate of Paranormal TV. The station is owned by 5GTV, LLC. KVHC-LD's transmitter is located off Edinburgh Drive in Kerrville. On cable, the station is available on Charter Spectrum channel 10 in Kerrville and Suddenlink channel 7 in Ingram.

In addition to Paranormal TV programming, KVHC-LD airs locally produced shows including Hill Country Lawyer and Heart of the Hill Country. The station also broadcasts several local and regional church services on Wednesday nights and all day on Sundays.

The then-KVHC-LP made a timely application to the Federal Communications Commission (FCC) for renewal of its channel 15 analog license and digital channel 16 construction permit in 2014. On June 5, 2014, KVHC-LP was notified by the FCC that, pending approval of engineering modifications, KVHC-LP's digital (channel 16) construction permit had been approved. Mary R. Silver has entered into a contract to transfer ownership of the FCC licenses to Doyle Weaver, a local Kerrville, Texas attorney.

On September 14, 2021, KVHC-LP was licensed for digital operation, changing its call sign to KVHC-LD.

On March 9, 2023, Bridge Media Networks (the parent company of 24/7 headline news service NewsNet, backed by 5-hour Energy creator Manoj Bhargava) announced it would acquire KVHC-LD for $1.3 million. Upon completion of the transaction, KVHC-LD will become Bhargava's fourth TV station property in the state of Texas.

Technical information

References

Television channels and stations established in 2002
2002 establishments in Texas
VHC-LD
Low-power television stations in the United States